Lesia Vasylivna Dychko (born Liudmyla (born 24 October 1939) is a Ukrainian music educator and composer.

Life
Lesia Dychko was born in Kyiv and graduated from the M.V. Lysenko Secondary Musical School in 1959 with a degree in music theory. In 1964 she graduated from the Kyiv National Musical Academy of Ukraine in composition, studying with Konstantyn Dankevych and Borys Lyatoshynsky. In 1971 she studied with Nikolai Peiko.

After completing her studies, Dychko worked as a composer and music teacher, lecturing at the Kyiv Pedagogical Institute from 1965 to 1966, at the Kyiv Arts Academy from 1972 to 1994, at the Studio of the Honored Ukrainian State Bandura Players Choir beginning in 1965. In 1994 she took a position as professor at the National Musical Academy of Ukraine, teaching composition and music theory. She also lectures as a visiting professor at other universities.

Works
Dychko incorporates elements of Ukrainian folk music and composes for orchestral, choral and instrumental performance including flute, violin, organ and piano. She also composes for sacred performance and film soundtracks. Selected works include:

Vertep, oratorio
Triumphant Liturgy for a cappella chorus and soloists
Pryvitannia zhyttia (Welcoming Life), symphony

References

External links
Ukrainian Composers Database
Entry from Ukrainian Musicians Directory
Info
Encyclopedia entry

1939 births
Living people
Kyiv Conservatory alumni
Ukrainian classical composers
Musicians from Kyiv
20th-century classical composers
Ukrainian music educators
Women classical composers
Women music educators
20th-century women composers